Saint Mary (also Maryam al-Muqaddasah, Maryam Moghaddas, Maryam Adhraa Maryam Al-Muqadasa; "The Honourable/Blessed Saint Mary") is a 2000 Iranian film by director Shahriar Bahrani, depicting the life of Mary mother of Jesus based on the Quran and Islamic tradition.

Plot
In the year 16 BCE, the people of Jerusalem are awaiting the birth of the son of Imran. Instead of the much-anticipated "Messiah", a girl is born to Imran and Anna. The latter names her Mary, which means "Servant of God". At the age of six, Mary is presented at the Temple, and remains there under the protection of the priest Zechariah until she turns sixteen.

While in seclusion, Mary spends all of her time in labour and prayers, and is harassed by the Jewish priests. She achieves such holiness that the angel Gabriel appears to her, foretelling that she will bear a holy man. She later gives birth to Jesus.

Production
The film bases the story of the life of Saint Mary and the birth of Jesus- a prophet in Islamic tradition on classical sources such as Chapter 19 of the Qur'an. Along with the character of Saint Mary, this film also featured the righteous character of the Prophet Zakariya, who in Islam was the guardian of Saint Mary.

The two-hour-long film was originally in Persian but has been dubbed into English by the Wilayah Network which was recorded in Hong Kong by Red Angel Media, and there is also another version with English subtitles. Footage from the film was used heavily in the 19 August 2007 British ITV documentary The Muslim Jesus.

Cast
Parviz Poorhosseini
Shabnam Gholikhani
Mohammad Kasebi
Maryam Razavi
Hossein Yari
Jafar Dehghan
Mehdi Faghih
Mohsen Zehtab
Afsaneh Naseri
Roya Teymorian
Shirin Bina
Zahra Saeedi
Kourosh Tahami
Mohammad Poursattar

See also
 List of Islamic films
The Messiah (Iranian film)
The Kingdom of Solomon
Iranian cinema
List of historical drama films

References

External links

Saint Mary website

DVD

1997 films
Iranian drama films
Persian-language films
Religious epic films
Portrayals of the Virgin Mary in film
Portrayals of Jesus in film
Films about religion
Films based on the Quran